Michael Coveney (born 24 July 1948) is a British theatre critic.

Education and career
Coveney was born in London and educated at St Ignatius’ College, Stamford Hill, and Worcester College, Oxford.

After graduation, he worked as a script reader for the Royal Court Theatre and from 1972 he contributed theatre reviews to the Financial Times. He was deputy editor (1973–75) and editor (1975–78) of Plays and Players magazine and theatre critic and deputy arts editor of the Financial Times throughout the 1980s.

He was theatre critic for The Observer from 1990 until he joined the Daily Mail in 1997, following the death of Jack Tinker. He remained at the Daily Mail until 2004. He was chief critic of the theatre website WhatsOnStage.co until retiring from the role in 2016.

He is the author of The Citz, a history of the Citizens Theatre (Nick Hern Books, 1990) and Maggie Smith: A Bright Particular Star (Victor Gollancz Ltd, 1993).

His book The Aisle Is Full of Noises (Nick Hern Books, 1994), a diary of a year in the theatre, was withdrawn following complaints of potential libel from Milton Shulman; although, as reported in The Times of 21 September 1994, Coveney "thought the comments were in the spirit of the book. I rather regret that Milton, of whom I am actually rather fond, didn't take them in that spirit." Most copies of the book had been sold before its withdrawal. In 2011, he published a biography of Ken Campbell, The Great Caper. 

He has also published a biography of Andrew Lloyd Webber, and a revised edition of his biography of Maggie Smith was published in 2015.

References

Selected publications
Coveney, Michael, The World According to Mike Leigh, (Paperback Edition, London: HarperCollins Publishers, 1997, Originally Published: London: HarperCollins Publishers, 1996), Includes a "Preface to the Paperback Edition," Pp. xvii–xxiv.

External links
Michael Coveney's Blog at Whatsonstage.com.

1948 births
Alumni of Worcester College, Oxford
British people of Irish descent
British theatre critics
People educated at St Ignatius' College, Enfield
Living people
Writers from London